Woree State School (WSS) is a public school situated in the southern suburbs of Cairns, North Queensland, Australia. The school provides education from Prep to Year 7 and has around 900 students. It was opened in 1980.

Its motto is '"Discover Strive Shine" and this replaced the school's original motto of "We Aim To Achieve" in 2009.

External links
 Official website - Woree State School

Public schools in Queensland
Schools in Cairns